Corey J. Swinson (December 15, 1969 – September 10, 2013) was an American football defensive tackle. After playing his college football at Hampton University, Swinson spent one season with the NFL's St. Louis Rams in 1995. He was originally drafted in the seventh round of the 1995 NFL Draft by the Miami Dolphins, but only spent pre-season on their roster.

Returning to Long Island after his short NFL career, Swinson was a coach at his alma mater Bay Shore High School. A lifelong resident of Bay Shore, New York, Swinson died on September 10, 2013, of natural causes.

References

1969 births
2013 deaths
American football defensive tackles
Hampton Pirates football players
Miami Dolphins players
St. Louis Rams players
People from Bay Shore, New York
Players of American football from New York (state)
Sportspeople from Suffolk County, New York
Bay Shore High School alumni